The Picton Pirates are a Junior ice hockey team based in Picton, Ontario, Canada. They play in the Tod Division of the Provincial Junior Hockey League.

League history
 
Nicknamed the "Patcheyes", the Picton Pirates were founded in 1989 as members of the Eastern Ontario Junior C Hockey League. In 1995, the Eastern Ontario Junior C Hockey League changed its name to the Empire B Junior C Hockey League to avoid further confusion with the rather local Ottawa District Hockey Association's Eastern Ontario Junior C Hockey League.

In 2016, the Empire B Junior C Hockey League became the Tod division of the Provincial Junior Hockey League, an amalgamation of the Southern Ontario junior 'C' leagues under a single banner.

Team history

The Pirates' first three seasons were disastrous.  With nine wins in three seasons, including a winless 1991–92 season, the Pirates did not have a lot to cheer about in the early going.  Finally, in the fourth season of operation, the Pirates came to life.  The Pirates celebrating winning seasons for the next ten years.  They capped off this strong run with their only league championship in the 1998-99 season.  The Pirates were also regular season champions in 1998 and 2000.

In recent years, the Pirates' records have been up and down.

In 2005–06, the Pirates finished the regular season in fourth place.  In the playoff quarter-final, the Pirates drew the upstart Colborne Cobras.  The series ended up being an upset as it went the distance and the Pirates were defeated 3-games-to-2 in a best-of-five.

The 2006–07 season was not good to the Picton Pirates.  They finished in fifth place, just barely outside the playoff picture.

The 2007–08 season was much of the same for the Picton Pirates.  They finished in fifth place, again just barely outside the playoff picture.

The 2008–09 season was different the Picton Pirates finished fourth but was swept by the Napanee Raiders in the first round of the playoffs

The 2009-10 season was the same as the 08-09 pirates ended in fourth and again was swept by the Napanee Raiders in round 1 of the playoffs.

The 2010–11 season was a year of redemption for the  3rd place Picton Pirates and faced off with the 2nd place Amherstview Jets in round 1 beating them in 7 games 4–3, The Pirates then moved on to face the 1st place Napanee Raiders who swept the Pirates 2 years in a row, but the Pirates had other plans for the Raiders taking the first 3 games to lead the series 3–0 the Raiders would claw back with the next 2 wins making it 3–2 but the Pirates were not to be denied in Game 6 at home in front of a packed house the pirates got out to an early 4–0 lead in the first and never looked back winning game 6 5–2 and the Empire Championship series 4–2.

On May 1, 2013, the Pirates became the second team in Empire League history to win the Clarence Schmalz Cup as OHA Junior C champions, defeating the Essex 73's of the Great Lakes Junior C Hockey League 4-games-to-1.

Season-by-season results

Schmalz Cup Finals appearances
2013: Picton Pirates defeated Essex 73's 4-games-to-1

External links
Pirates' Webpage

Empire Junior C Hockey League teams